Trinity Presbyterian Church, known from 1972 on as Mission United Presbyterian Church, is a historic Presbyterian church at 3261 23rd Street in the Mission District of San Francisco, California.

It was built in 1891 and added to the National Register of Historic Places in 1982.

It is one of relatively few works by architects Percy & Hamilton which survived the 1906 earthquake.

References

Churches in San Francisco
Presbyterian churches in California
Mission District, San Francisco
Churches completed in 1891
National Register of Historic Places in San Francisco
Churches on the National Register of Historic Places in California
San Francisco Designated Landmarks
Romanesque Revival church buildings in California